Military-civil fusion (MCF) or civil-military fusion is a strategy and policy of the Chinese Communist Party (CCP) with the stated goal of developing the People's Liberation Army (PLA) into a world-class military.

Background
The institutional foundations of PLA's weapon development and research are copied from the Soviet Union, where state-owned factories and companies develop and manufacture equipment based on a top-down command approach. Other major weaknesses include monopoly in the defense industry held by state-owned companies, bureaucratic inefficacy, corruption, lack of innovation, outdated pricing and contracting process. Chinese state-owned defense corporations are historically uncoordinated and inefficient, inclined toward to the preservation of their state-sanctioned monopoly, exploiting their gain in a privileged position due to obstruction in fair competition with private enterprises. In 2010, Chinese researchers estimated that less than one percent of the Chinese high-tech enterprises were involved in defense-related activity.

History
The term "military-civil fusion" first emerged in the late 1990s. Hu Jintao, then-vice chairman of the CCP's Central Military Commission, uses the term to describe the coordination between civic and military sectors. The concept of "military-civil fusion" dates back to Mao Zedong and the founding of the People's Republic of China (PRC). Defense analyst Richard Bitzinger notes that military-civil fusion efforts under current CCP general secretary Xi Jinping are more ambitious than those of his predecessors.

MCF was first used in 1980s primarily for converting military factories over to civilian production under the backdrop of the economic reform, which failed to bring innovative commercial technologies into the military sector. The PLA acquired defense product through state-owned enterprises, while private companies only had limited contribution and involvement. Corruption and graft also contributed to the continuous preference toward state-owned companies, even when alternative options existed. Certain areas of development in China's military-industrial complex did see some benefits from the military-civilian integration, particularly for the shipbuilding, information technology, and aerospace industry.

Analysts Elsa B. Kania and Lorand Laskai noted Xi Jinping's initiative may lead to a breakthrough in efficiency and innovations, however, the initiative indicates China's attempt to overcome military procurement and research and development (R&D) deficiencies instead of a sign of strength. Richard A. Bitzinger believes MCF would requires significant effort and resources to implement successfully, given the current legal, regulatory, and cultural hurdles that exist in the Chinese government. Analyst Christian Brose argues that Chinese military capabilities have improved significantly in the 2010s due to relative success in fusing the defense and civilian sector for military development and production.

Emily Weinstein noted that the Chinese government has studied the U.S. military-civil framework, with research papers examining the successes and drawbacks of its implementation in the United States, such as Pentagon's Defense Innovation Unit, Defense Advanced Research Projects Agency (DARPA). China recognized the technological superiority the U.S. has achieved through collaboration between the U.S. government institutions and leading technologies companies in the U.S., such as the case of SpaceX, Amazon, Microsoft, and Google. China attempted to replicate and modified the framework as per domestic needs. However, the Chinese government can demand information and assistance from companies with more hardline approach than that of the United States.

General policies
MCF promotes the use of dual-use technology and two-way transfer, in which defense companies, universities, and research institutions can collaborate and share technologies between military and civilian sectors. The term "civil-military integration" (CMI) was gradually replaced by the term "military-civil fusion" under the Xi Jinping administration, possibly inkling the latter has increased level of coordination in civil–military relations or a more balanced attention between military and civilian developments.

MCF influences investment decisions, talent recruitment, and research and development (R&D) across multiple fields. In January 2017, Xi Jinping created a Central Military-Civil Fusion Development Committee (CMCFDC), which is responsible for the planning and implementation of the MCF in China.

In 2021, China implemented a Five-Year Plan to set overall guidance for policies and national development goals through 2025. The document called for further coordination in the development of critical and emergent technologies, which is in-line with the goal of military-civil fusion.

In 2021, Janes reported the easing the administrative burden on private defense companies, and stimulating greater competition in China's defense industry.

Response
Several U.S. government agencies have deployed their own definitions of military-civil fusion. In May 2020, the Trump administration issued a presidential proclamation banning Chinese students and researchers from coming to the United States based on their perceived relationship with military-civil fusion. The executive order describes military-civil fusion as a mean to "acquire and divert foreign technologies". Analyst noted the definition is largely divorced from the purpose and objective of military-civil fusion, instead, it describes China's general issues on technology transfer.

Multiple analysts and think tanks have proposed ways in which the US could respond to China's MCF strategy.

See also
 Civil–military relations
 Civil-military co-operation
 Arms industry
 Military–industrial complex
 List of defense contractors
 2015 People's Republic of China military reform

References

People's Liberation Army
Military history of the People's Republic of China
China
Civil–military relations